Ofer (lit. Fawn) is a moshav in northern Israel. Located south of Haifa, it falls under the jurisdiction of Hof HaCarmel Regional Council.

History

The moshav was founded in 1950 by immigrants from India (mainly  Cochin) and Iran. Its name is derived from Ayn Ghazal (lit. Deer Spring), the depopulated Palestinian village on whose land it was built.  It is also on some of the land of the  depopulated villages of Khirbat Al-Manara and Khirbat al-Sawamir.

Agricultural income is derived from raising cattle, sheep and chickens, growing vegetables and flowers, and tourism.
A circular nature trail loops around Moshav Ofer, the Paamon Cave and a large section of the Carmel Beach Forest.

References

Cochin Jews
Indian-Jewish culture in Israel
Iranian-Jewish culture in Israel
Moshavim
Populated places established in 1950
Populated places in Haifa District
1950 establishments in Israel